Digrammia sublacteolata is a species of geometrid moth in the family Geometridae.

The MONA or Hodges number for Digrammia sublacteolata is 6355.

References

Further reading

 

Macariini
Articles created by Qbugbot
Moths described in 1887